Kivikko  is a quarter of Helsinki, the capital of Finland. Part of the Mellunkylä district, it was built during the 1990s and the first decade of the 2000s. The quarter is located on the west side of Kontula, an important subregional centre and will have a population of 5000 once completed.

Kivikko is especially favoured by families with children. 14% of the inhabitants are immigrants or have immigrant roots, which is more than in most of Helsinki. There is also student housing in the area. However, Kivikko is generally more peaceful and less densely built than nearby Kontula.

Politics 
Results of the 2022 Municipal Elections in Kivikko:

Results of the 2011 Finnish parliamentary election in Kivikko:

True Finns   27.4%
Social Democratic Party   22.5%
National Coalition Party   13.5%
Green League   11.8%
Left Alliance   11.6%
Centre Party   3.6%
Christian Democrats   3.3%
Swedish People's Party   2.3%

References

Quarters of Helsinki